David "Talin" Joiner is an American game programmer, who created games such as The Faery Tale Adventure and Inherit the Earth, contributed audio to Defender of the Crown II (1993), engineering for SimCity 4: Rush Hour (2003), and The Sims 2: University (2005).

Career as programmer
Joiner learned Assembler, Fortran, and COBOL programming between 1976-1980 at the Strategic Air Command headquarters in Omaha, Nebraska. In his spare time he coded a space war game on terminals. At the location he also became familiar with coding on Commodore PET, and the Apple II. After leaving the military he joined DataSoft and worked in a professional programmer environment. He then became part of IntelliCreations, and then Mindscape, then begun working on the Amiga 1000 and with MicroIllusions, which started out from a computer store in San Fernando Valley.

According to The Digital Antiquarian, "The seeds of MicroIllusions were planted during one day’s idle conversation when Steinert complained to David Joiner that, while the Amiga supposedly had speech synthesis built into its operating system, he had never actually heard his machines talk; [] .. He proved as good as his word within a few hours. Impressed, Steinert asked if he could sell the new program in his store for a straight 50/50 split. When the program sold well, Steinert decided to get into Amiga software development in earnest with the help of Joiner."

Joiner then begun working on The Faery Tale Adventure, which took him seven months. MicroIllusions published The Faery Tale Adventure first in 1986. In 1988 he wrote Discovery, an educational music editor related hacked game.

Joiner appeared on television of the Computer Chronicles to demonstrate Music-X. He later published under Sylvan Technical Arts. He worked a year on The Sims 2, then left EA. More recently he worked on the user interface of Google+.

Publications
In 1998 Joiner published Real interactivity in interactive entertainment.

References

External links
David Joiner's homepage
David Joiner at MobyGames
David Joiner & Music-X Amiga Based Sequencer (On television show Computer Chronicles)

1958 births
American video game designers
American video game programmers
Electronic Arts employees
Google employees
Living people
Role-playing game designers
Software engineers